The Instituto Estetico Manila Volley Masters are a professional men's volleyball team playing in various tournaments, including the Philippine Super Liga (PSL) and the Spikers' Turf. The team is owned by Instituto Estetico Manila, a dental and dermatological clinic.

In 2014, the team joined the Philippine Super Liga in its 2014 All-Filipino Conference. This was followed by its participation in the inaugural men's tournament of the Shakey's V-League, where it emerged as that league's first men's champion.

History
Cosmetic surgeon Reyvic Cerilles established a women's volleyball team in 2001 which took part in the two-woman tournament Club 650. Cerilles named it after Instituto Estetico Manila, his own clinic. The team became inactive in 2005. In 2011, the IEM volleyball team was revived as a men's side which went on to participate in club tournaments abroad such as in Thailand and Malaysia. In 2014, the team was invited to join the Philippine Super Liga. IEM also joined the Spikers' Turf.

Current roster 

Coaching staff
 Head Coach:Pathie Jamiri
 Assistant Coach:Romnick Samson

Team Staff
 Team Manager:Reyvic Cerilles
 Team Utility: 

Medical Staff
 Team Physician:Gian Gonzales
 Physical Therapist:

Previous roster

Premier Volleyball League 

Coaching staff
 Head Coach: Rafael Presnede
 Assistant Coach(s): Krisjohn Pantallon

Team Staff
 Team Manager: Reyvic Cerilles
 Team Utility: 

Medical Staff
 Team Physician: Gian Gonzales
 Physical Therapist:

Coaching staff
 Head Coach: Renz Mauro Ordoñez
 Assistant Coach(s): Krisjohn Pantallon

Team Staff
 Team Manager: Reyvic Cerilles
 Team Utility: 

Medical Staff
 Team Physician: Gian Gonzales
 Physical Therapist:

Coaching staff
 Head Coach: Ernesto Balubar
 Assistant Coach(s): Krisjohn Pantallon

Team Staff
 Team Manager: Reyvic Cerilles
 Team Utility: 

Medical Staff
 Team Physician:
 Physical Therapist:

Spikers' Turf 

Coaching staff
 Head Coach:Rafael Presnede
 Assistant Coach:Edward Arroyo

Team Staff
 Team Manager:Reyvic Cerilles
 Team Utility: 

Medical Staff
 Team Physician:Gian Gonzales
 Physical Therapist:

Coaching staff
 Head Coach: Ernesto Balubar
 Assistant Coach(s): Joseph Santos

Team Staff
 Team Manager: Reyvic Cerilles
 Team Utility: 

Medical Staff
 Team Physician:
 Physical Therapist:

Philippine Super Liga 

Coaching staff
 Head Coach:
 Assistant Coach(s):

Team Staff
 Team Manager:
 Team Utility: 

Medical Staff
 Team Physician:
 Physical Therapist:

Coaching staff
 Head Coach: Ernesto Balubar
 Assistant Coach(s): Joseph Santos  Gian Gonzales

Team Staff
 Team Manager: Reyvic Cerilles
 Team Utility: 

Medical Staff
 Team Physician: Reyvic Cerilles
 Physical Therapist:

Honors

Team 
Spikers’ Turf / Premier Volleyball League:

Philippine Superliga:

Individual 
Spikers’ Turf / Premier Volleyball League:

Philippine Superliga:

Notes:

Team Captains 
Spikers’ Turf / Premier Volleyball League:

Philippine Superliga:

References

External links 

Premier Volleyball League (Philippines)
Philippine Super Liga
Shakey's V-League
2011 establishments in the Philippines
Volleyball clubs established in 2011
Men's volleyball teams in the Philippines